Jean-Marie Chardonnens (born 13 December 1942) is a Swiss former wrestler who competed in the 1968 Summer Olympics and in the 1972 Summer Olympics.

References

External links
 

1942 births
Living people
Olympic wrestlers of Switzerland
Wrestlers at the 1968 Summer Olympics
Wrestlers at the 1972 Summer Olympics
Swiss male sport wrestlers